Maria Ivanovna Litvinenko-Volgemut (Ukrainian: Марія Іванівна Литвиненко-Вольгемут; 13 February 1892  3 April 1966) was a Ukrainian opera singer and music teacher. She was named People's Artist of the USSR in 1936 and awarded the State Stalin Prize in 1946.

Biography 

Maria Litvinenko was born in Kiev, then part of the Russian Empire, on 13 February 1892, in the family of a worker of the Arsenal Factory.

From the age of seven she sang in the church choir, where she learnt solfeggio.

In 1912, she graduated from the Kiev School of Music of the Russian Musical Society (vocal class of M. Alekseeva-Yunevich).

In 1912–1914, she performed at the M. Sadovsky Theater in Kiev.

In 1920-1922 she was a soloist of a troupe organized by her, the "First Labor Cooperative of Ukrainian Artists" in Vinnytsia.

In 1923–1935, she was a soloist of the Ukrainian State Capital Opera (now the Kharkiv State Academic Opera and Ballet Theatre named after Mykola Lysenko).

In 1935-1953 she was a soloist of the National Opera of Ukraine. During the World War II they were evacuated to Ufa (1941-1942) and then to Irkutsk (1942-1944). During this period, she performed for the Red Army.

In 1944-1964 she taught at the Kiev Conservatory.

Maria Ivanovna Litvinenko-Volgemut died on 3 April 1966 in Kiev and buried in the Baikove Cemetery.

Awards 

 People's Artist of the USSR (1936)
 State Stalin Prize (1946) for outstanding achievements in (soprano) opera performance.
 Order of Lenin (1946)
 Order of the Red Banner of Labour (1936, 1948, 1951)

References

External links 

1892 births
1966 deaths
Musicians from Kyiv
20th-century Ukrainian women opera singers
Ukrainian music educators
Academic staff of Kyiv Conservatory
Communist Party of the Soviet Union members
People's Artists of the USSR
Stalin Prize winners
Recipients of the Order of Lenin
Recipients of the Order of the Red Banner of Labour